Tom Gammill and Max Pross are an American comedy writing team. Together they have written episodes for such successful shows as Seinfeld, The Critic, The Wonder Years, It's Garry Shandling's Show, and Monk. They have also worked as producers on The Simpsons and Futurama.

Early career 
Pross and Gammill started to write comedy sketches together for Saturday Night Live in 1979.

In 1981 they co-wrote Steve Martin's fourth NBC special "Steve Martin's Best Show Ever" with such notable comedy writers as Eric Idle, Dan Aykroyd, and Lorne Michaels. They spent the next few years as part of the original writing staff of "Late Night With David Letterman," and also contributed short films for the show after leaving the staff.

In 1984 they worked on the writing staff of another Lorne Michaels production, The New Show - a comedy sketch show with guests including Steve Martin and John Candy, which was similar to Saturday Night Live, but nowhere near as successful. It ran for less than one season.

In 1987 they joined the writing staff on It's Garry Shandling's Show, and in 1989 they wrote an episode for The Wonder Years called "Math Class". They were both listed as contributors to the short-lived zine Army Man in 1989.

In 1992 they created and produced the Fox series Great Scott! starring Tobey Maguire and Kevin Connolly.

Work on Seinfeld 
Tom Gammill and Max Pross joined the Seinfeld writing team during the show's fifth season (1993-1994) and stayed until the show's penultimate eighth season (1996-1997). On the Seinfeld DVDs, Jerry Seinfeld credits the pair with bringing a "buoyancy" to the writing staff that aided the development of fresh ideas during the show's middle years. Seinfeld mentioned that he and co-creator Larry David were initially worried about Gammill and Pross' writing style, as the pair created stories that were a "level of silliness" that the show had never gone to before. Ultimately the worry was unfounded, as the pair ended up writing some of the most famous Seinfeld shows during the series' run. The episodes they wrote were:

SEASON 5

 "The Glasses"
 "The Cigar Store Indian"
 "The Pie"
 "The Raincoats, Part 1" with Jerry Seinfeld and Larry David
 "The Raincoats, Part 2" with Jerry Seinfeld and Larry David

SEASON 6

 "The Pledge Drive"
 "The Mom & Pop Store"
 "The Race" with Larry David
 "The Doorman"
 "The Diplomat's Club"

SEASON 7

 "The Wink"
 "The Gum"
 "The Doll"

SEASON 8

 "The Checks" with Steve O'Donnell

The Critic episode 

Tom Gammill and Max Pross wrote one episode of The Critic titled "Marty's First Date", in which Marty invites his dad Jay to career day at his school where Marty develops a crush on a Cuban girl named Carmen. They go on a date but when Carmen decides to fly back to Cuba, Marty follows her and Jay must get his son back. It was the second episode of season 1 and aired on 2/2/1994.

Work on The Simpsons 

Gammill and Pross have been producers on The Simpsons since 1999, they started as consulting producers then they got promoted to producers in 2001. They won an Emmy Award for Outstanding Animated Program in 2001 for the episode "HOMR". For season 24 Tom Gammill and Max Pross wrote the episode: "Hardly Kirk-ing, which was nominated for a WGA Award. For season 28, they also wrote the episode: "Monty Burns' Fleeing Circus". For Season 29, they wrote the episodes: "Whistler's Father", "The Old Blue Mayor She Ain't What She Used to Be" and "3 Scenes Plus a Tag from a Marriage" and for season 31, they wrote the episode: "The Incredible Lightness of Being a Baby".

Film 

Gammill and Pross worked as uncredited writers on Son of the Mask, the Raspberry Award-winning 2005 sequel to the 1994 comedy film, The Mask. They are also given story credits on the 2007 comedy Full of It, in which a teenage boy is forced to live out the lies he had told in order to become popular.  Dialogue in Ghostbusters II refers to a "Gammill and Pross Infant Acuity Test" though their contribution to the film is unknown.

References

External links
 
 

American television writers
American male television writers
American television producers
Screenwriting duos
1957 births
Living people
Primetime Emmy Award winners